Mekorot (lit. "Sources") is the national water company of Israel and the country's top agency for water management. Founded in 1937, it supplies Israel with 90% of its drinking water and operates a cross-country water supply network known as the National Water Carrier. Mekorot and its subsidiaries have partnered with numerous countries around the world in areas including desalination and water management.

History
Mekorot was established as the "Ḥevrat ha-Mayim" ('Water Company') on 15 February 1937 by Levi Shkolnik (later Eshkol, Prime Minister of Israel between 1963-1969), water engineer Simcha Blass, and Pinchas Koslovsky (later Sapir, Minister of Finance between 1963-1968).

Water supply system
Mekorot supplies 80% of Israel's drinking water and 70% of its water supplies. The company runs 3,000 installations throughout the country for water supply, water quality, infrastructure, sewage purification, desalination, rain enhancement, etc. Mekorot oversees operations of 691 pumping stations, 2,565 pumps, 1,200 wells, 12,000 km of large-diameter pipes, 714 concrete and steel pools and tanks and 104 large earth reservoirs.
Mekorot supplies water to the domestic, agriculture and industrial sectors, and to the Kingdom of Jordan and the Palestinian Authority, in accordance with its undertakings in political agreements.
Mekorot's water supply system unifies most of the regional water plants, the National Water Carrier and Yarkon-Negev plant, and draws water from the Sea of Galilee, aquifers, boreholes, seawater, desalinated water, and brackish water.

National Water Carrier

Mekorot's National Water Carrier, known in Hebrew as  Hamovil ha'artzi, runs from Lake Kinneret in the north to the northern Negev Desert in the south. The system has been expanded to pipe water from desalination plants on the Mediterranean coast.

Water tariffs
Water tariffs are set by the Ministry of National Infrastructure and Ministry of Finance, and approved by the Knesset Finance Committee. Tariffs are updated from time to time according to changes in the Consumer Price Index, electricity rates and the average wage index. The rates vary according to use: domestic, consumption and services, industry and agriculture. Rates for industrial and agricultural use are lower than those for domestic consumption and services. The bulk water tariff is the same throughout the country, regardless of the difference in supply costs.

Water filtering
In 2008, Mekorot established a central water filtering plant for water pumped from Lake Kinneret. The company also improved quality control. As a result, water quality has improved and less chlorine is added to the water as a disinfecting agent.

Global presence
Mekorot signed a memorandum of understanding with India-based Jain Irrigation Systems in 2008. The two companies agreed to cooperate in exploring the potential for projects in the areas of desalination, water resource management, and wastewater treatment and reclamation relating to urban infrastructure in India.

In 2012 a subsidiary of Mekorot entered into a major contract with a delegation from India involving the deployment of water control and smart metering systems in Uttar Pradesh in order to prevent water waste.

The government of Cyprus signed an agreement with a consortium consisting of Mekorot Development and Enterprise Ltd and a Cypriot company in 2009 for construction of a desalination plant in Limassol. The Limassol agreement was followed by an agreement to construct a second desalination plant in Larnaca, bringing the projected combined output of the two plants to 40% of Cyprus' drinking water.

Mekorot signed an agreement with Uganda's National Water and Sewerage Corporation in 2011. According to the agreement, the Ugandan government will allocate tens of millions of dollars toward the construction of dams and reservoirs at four locations in the country.

A meeting between Mekorot officials and an Akron, Ohio delegation led by Don Plusquellic in 2012 led to an announcement that Mekorot would be opening its first U.S. office with Akron's Global Business Accelerator. The office will coordinate information exchange relating to water security, water technology and energy technology, with an ultimate objective of commercializing joint ventures, creating jobs, and developing the economy.

The Water Supply Master Plan (WSMP) for the Marathwada region of the state of Maharashtra, India, was awarded to Mekorot Development & Enterprise Ltd. (MDE), a subsidiary of Mekorot, Israel National Water Co., by the Maharashtra Jeevan Pradhikaran (MJP), the state government-run water company. The MDE-MJP contract was signed on February 21, 2018 under the umbrella of the memorandum of understanding (MoU) signed between the Government of Israel and the Government of Maharashtra as part of broader government-to-government (G2G) collaboration between India and Israel. According to the contract, the Mekorot team is to prepare a comprehensive water supply master plan, covering all types of water resources and demand categories (potable and urban, livestock and agriculture), in order to help achieve sustainable long-term water balance and minimise water shortage crises.

The Water Conservation and Management Master Plan (WCMMP) for the State of Punjab was awarded to Mekorot water company Ltd, Israel National Water Company, by Punjab Water Resources Management and Development Corporation, under the Managing Director Punjab Water Resources Management and Development Corporation. The contract was signed on April 15, 2019, under the umbrella of the memorandum of understanding (MoU) signed between the parties on October 23, 2018. 
According to the agreement, Mekorot prepared a comprehensive water conservation and management master plan, covering all types of water resources and demand categories to help achieve sustainable long-term water balance and minimize any water shortage crises. This was done mainly by promoting State water sector's policy, management regulations and increasing efficiency in water use.

International political controversy
In 2013, Netherlands' largest water company Vitens withdrew from an agreement with Mekorot, citing concern about violation of international law. According to Dutch media the withdrawal followed consultations with the Dutch Ministry of Foreign Affairs and was caused by Mekorot's role in supplying water to Israeli settlements on the West Bank.

A spokesperson for the Israeli government called the decision "absurd", pointing to Israel having signed an agreement with the Palestinian authorities and Jordan about future water allocations.

See also
 Water supply and sanitation in Israel

References

External links
 Mekorot web site

Government-owned companies of Israel
Hydraulic engineering
Utilities of Israel
Water supply and sanitation in Israel